Grammoechus tagax is a species of beetle in the family Cerambycidae. It was described by Holzschuh in 2003.

References

Pteropliini
Beetles described in 2003